David Stern (1820–1875) was a German-born American businessman who helped to found Levi Strauss & Co. with his brother-in-law Levi Strauss.

Biography
David Stern was born to a Jewish family in Bavaria in 1820. In the 1840s, he immigrated to the United States first to New York then the American South and finally to San Francisco in 1853 or 1855 where he was later joined by his brother-in-law Levi Strauss. Strauss had been sent to San Francisco - which was booming due to the gold rush - to scout out a larger location for the family merchandising company. In 1858, he was listed as a co-owner of the company under the name Strauss, Levi (David Stern & Lewis Strauss) importers clothing in the San Francisco Directory where Stern served as its manager and Strauss as its sales manager. In 1860, the company was renamed as Levi Strauss & Co. In 1873, the company received the patent for its jeans, the first to use metal rivets on workpants made with denim cloth.

Personal life
In 1850, he married Fanny Strauss, the sister of Levi Strauss in New York. They had 8 children: Jacob and Caroline (both born in New York); and Henry, Sigmund, Louis, Harriet "Hattie", Abraham, and Lillian (all born in San Francisco). He was a member of the Eureka Benevolent Society (later the Jewish Family Service) and Congregation Emanu-El. Two of his sons married sisters, the daughters of Lazard Frères head Marc Eugene Meyer: his son, Sigmund Stern, married Rosalie Meyer; and his son Abraham Stern, married, Elise Meyer. Sigmund's only child, Elise, married Walter A. Haas, the son of Abraham Haas, whose descendants are the current owners of Levi Strauss & Co.

David Stern died in 1875 in San Francisco. The company incorporated in 1890 with Levi Strauss as president, Jacob Stern as First Vice President, Sigmund Stern as Second Vice President, Louis Stern as Treasurer, and Abraham Stern as Secretary. After the death of Levi Strauss in 1902 - who had no children - Stern's sons took over ownership of the company. The Sigmund Stern Recreation Grove is named for his son.

References

1820 births
1875 deaths
19th-century German Jews
Bavarian emigrants to the United States
Businesspeople from San Francisco
19th-century American businesspeople